The International Women's Writing Guild (IWWG) was founded in 1976 by Hannelore Hahn. It is a 501(c)3 non-profit writing organization whose mission is to "empower women writers personally and professionally through writing."

Programs 
The IWWG sponsors an annual week-long writing conference for women writers every summer, as well as a variety of regional events throughout the year.  The summer conference centers around 30 different workshops, open readings for participants, and an art studio.  Regional volunteers time to organize round table discussions in their local areas and offer mentoring to other writers.  There are also day long retreats that take place around the country. No portfolio or experience is needed for these retreats.

While IWWG accepts members, writers do not need to be a member in order to attend these conferences and events.  The membership does give access to discounts to the events, as well as opportunities to network and sell published work.

The IWWG has been an official Non-Governmental Organization (NGO) with special consultative status at the United Nations Economic and Social Council since 1998.

The IWWG collects an annual membership fee from registered members. It offers workshops in person and online through its Digital Village.

Notable members 
2020 Board of Directors:
Cathleen O'Connor, Board Chair
Laura L. Kieley, Board Vice Chair
Hope Player, Treasurer
Caridad Pineiro, Secretary
Kelly Du Mar
Leslie Neustadt
Marisa Moks-Unger
Paula Scardamalia
Michelle Miller, Executive Director

Works 

 Hahn, Hannelore. Remember the Magic: The Story of the International Women's Writing Guild in celebration of Its 25th Anniversary, in Her Own Words (2001) New York: International Women's Writing Guild.

References

External links 
International Women's Writing Guild official website
International Women's Writing Guild records at the Sophia Smith Collection, Smith College Special Collections
Hannelore Hahn Papers at the State Archives of North Carolina
Thompson, Nancy J. "Learning to teach – the International Women's Writing Guild annual conference." Humanist. May-June, 1996.
Feminist organizations in the United States
Writers' organizations
Organizations for women writers
Organizations established in 1976